Salpingectomy refers to the surgical removal of a Fallopian tube.  This may be done to treat an ectopic pregnancy or cancer, to prevent cancer, or as a form of contraception.

This procedure is now sometimes preferred over its ovarian tube-sparing counterparts due to the risk of ectopic pregnancies.  For contraceptive purposes, this procedure is irreversible and more effective than tubal ligation.

Classification 
Salpingectomy is different from and predates both salpingostomy and salpingotomy. The latter two terms are often used interchangeably and refer to creating an opening into the tube (e.g. to remove an ectopic pregnancy), but the tube itself is not removed. Technically, the creation of a new tubal opening (os, after the Latin word for mouth) by surgery would be a salpingostomy, while the incision into the tube to remove an ectopic is a salpingotomy.

Indications
The procedure was performed by Lawson Tait in 1883 in women with a bleeding ectopic pregnancy; this procedure has since saved the lives of countless women. Other indications for a salpingectomy include infected tubes (as in a hydrosalpinx) or as part of the surgical procedure for tubal cancer.

A bilateral salpingectomy will lead to sterility, and was used for that purpose; however, less invasive, possibly reversible procedures have become available as tubal occlusion procedures. Bilateral salpingectomies continue to be requested by some voluntarily childfree people over tubal ligation because it reduces the risk of developing cancer; this is called prophylactic salpingectomy. It can be performed non-electively on women who are at a high risk of developing ovarian cancer, as a preventative measure.

Process
Salpingectomy has traditionally been done via a laparotomy; more recently however, laparoscopic salpingectomies have become more common as part of minimally invasive surgery. The tube is severed at the point where it enters the uterus and along its mesenteric edge with hemostatic control.

Salpingo-oophorectomy
Salpingectomy is commonly done as part of a procedure called a salpingo-oophorectomy, where one or both ovaries, as well as one or both Fallopian tubes, are removed in one operation (a Bilateral Salpingo-Oophorectomy (BSO) if both ovaries and Fallopian tubes are removed).  If a BSO is combined with an abdominal hysterectomy (there are different methods of hysterectomy available), the procedure is commonly called a TAH-BSO: Total Abdominal Hysterectomy with a Bilateral Salpingo-Oophorectomy. Sexual intercourse remains possible after salpingectomy, surgical and radiological cancer treatments, and chemotherapy. Reconstructive surgery remains an option for women who have experienced benign and malignant conditions.

History
Salpingectomies were performed in the United States in the early 20th century in accordance with eugenics legislation. From Buck v. Bell (1927):

Buck v. Bell, while not expressly overturned, was implicitly overturned by Skinner v. Oklahoma (1942), in which the Court held that a person's choices whether to aid in the propagation of the human species was a cognizable fundamental right guaranteed under the 14th Amendment of the Constitution, a liberty retained by the people under the 9th Amendment of the Constitution.

See also
 Tuboplasty
 Prophylactic salpingectomy
 List of surgeries by type

References

Gynecological surgery
Surgical removal procedures
Sterilization (medicine)